Longerak is a village in Bygland municipality in Agder county, Norway. The village is located on the eastern shore of the lake Byglandsfjorden. The water from the lake is used in the Longerak power station to produce hydroelectric power.

References

Villages in Agder
Bygland